Public security may refer to:
Public safety
Public security in the general sense

Organizations whose names include the words "Public Security"
Ministry of Public Security of the People's Republic of China, law enforcement agency of People's Republic of China
Public Security Bureau, local bureaus
Public Security Intelligence Agency, an intelligence agency of Japan